Jerome Davis (born March 4, 1974) is a former gridiron football offensive tackle. He was signed by the Detroit Lions as an undrafted free agent in 1997. He played college football at Minnesota.

Davis was also a member of the Carolina Panthers, Denver Broncos, Calgary Stampeders, San Francisco 49ers, Hamilton Tiger-Cats and Toronto Argonauts.

External links
Toronto Argonauts bio

1974 births
Living people
Players of American football from Detroit
American football defensive tackles
American football offensive tackles
American players of Canadian football
Canadian football offensive linemen
Minnesota Golden Gophers football players
Detroit Lions players
Frankfurt Galaxy players
Carolina Panthers players
Denver Broncos players
Calgary Stampeders players
San Francisco 49ers players
Toronto Argonauts players
Hamilton Tiger-Cats players